An urban district (Danish: bydel; lit. "city part") is the name used for urban or municipality districts in some of the larger municipalities of Denmark.
The term is not strictly defined, but is usually bigger than a quarter or a city block.

Districts of Copenhagen 

There are 10 urban districts in Copenhagen, each with a local city council (Danish: lokaludvalg). The districts are Indre By, Vesterbro/Kongens Enghave, Nørrebro, Østerbro, Amager Øst, Amager Vest, Valby, Bispebjerg, Vanløse, and Brønshøj-Husum. 

Vesterbro and Kongens Enghave have separate local councils and Indre By has a local council from Christianshavn as well, so there are 12 local city councils.

Districts of Aahus 
Aarhus is divided into several districts and suburbs with its own postal code (Danish: postdistrikter).

Districts (boroughs) inside the 2nd city beltway:
Aarhus C
Aarhus N
Aarhus V
Aarhus S
Åbyhøj
Viby
Brabrand

References 

Geography of Denmark